Lumsdon is a surname. Notable people with the surname include:

Chris Lumsdon (born 1979), English footballer
Cliff Lumsdon (1931–1991), Canadian world champion marathon swimmer
John Lumsdon (born 1956), British footballer
Les Lumsdon (1912–1977), Australian cartoonist